Thorbjørn Schierup (born 6 June 1990 in Aarhus, Denmark) is a Danish sailor.  He competed at the 2012 Summer Olympics in the Men's Laser class where he placed 19th.

References

Danish male sailors (sport)
1990 births
Living people
Olympic sailors of Denmark
Sailors at the 2012 Summer Olympics – Laser
Sportspeople from Aarhus